Nemopoda pectinulata is a European species of flies and member of the family Sepsidae.

References

Sepsidae
Muscomorph flies of Europe
Insects described in 1873
Taxa named by Hermann Loew